Howard Mansion and Carriage House is a historic mansion and carriage house in Hyde Park, New York.

History
It was designed by architect Charles Follen McKim (1847-1909) and built in 1896. It is a two-story, six-bay, eclectic dwelling built of uncoursed fieldstone. The house is rectangular in plan and has a wood shingled roof with overhanging twin gables. The front entrance is a Dutch door and features a portico supported by two square, bracketed columns. The carriage house is a two-story, wood frame, stucco covered, Tudor style building built in 1901. It features a two-story, polygonal bay with a polygonal roof. Frederick W. Vanderbilt had the house built for his nephew, Thomas H. Howard.

National Register of Historic Places
It was added to the National Register of Historic Places in 1993.

See also
Thomas H. Howard
Vanderbilt Mansion National Historic Site

References

Houses on the National Register of Historic Places in New York (state)
Tudor Revival architecture in New York (state)
Houses completed in 1896
Houses in Hyde Park, New York
Vanderbilt family residences
National Register of Historic Places in Dutchess County, New York